Todd Nicholson,  (born January 28, 1969) is a Canadian former ice sledge hockey player. He was a member of the 2010 Paralympic Sledge Ice Hockey team, the fourth Paralympic games that Nicholson participated in.  He announced his retirement from the Canadian ice sledge hockey team on September 7, 2010 (along with captain Jean Labonte, Paul Rosen, and Herve Lord).  Nicholson now serves on the International Paralympic Committee Governing Board as the Athletes' Representative.

Early life
On the way home from his high school prom, Nicholson was involved in a car accident that left him as a paraplegic.

Hockey Canada
When not competing for Canada, Nicholson participates in the Ottawa Carleton Sledge Hockey Association.

Personal
The township of West Carleton hosted Todd Nicholson Day on June 6, 2000, to honour his achievements in hockey. Nicholson volunteers with numerous charities including the Heart and Stroke Foundation, Kids Sports and the Canadian Paralympic Committee. When not playing hockey, Nicholson works as a Project Officer for the Canada Border Services Agency.

His Dunrobin, Ontario home was destroyed in the 2018 Ottawa–Gatineau tornadoes.

Awards and honours
Queen's Jubilee Award
Tournament All-Star team, 1998 Paralympic Games
Tournament All-Star team, 2002 Paralympic Games
Canada's flag bearer at the 2006 Paralympic Games
Inducted into the Ottawa Sports Hall of Fame / Athlete Category, May 2014
Inducted into the Canadian Disability Hall of Fame, 2017.
Awarded the Meritorious Service Cross in 2016.

References

External links 
 
 

1969 births
Living people
Canadian sledge hockey players
Paralympic sledge hockey players of Canada
Paralympic gold medalists for Canada
Paralympic silver medalists for Canada
Ice sledge hockey players at the 1998 Winter Paralympics
Ice sledge hockey players at the 2002 Winter Paralympics
Ice sledge hockey players at the 2006 Winter Paralympics
Ice sledge hockey players at the 2010 Winter Paralympics
Medalists at the 1994 Winter Paralympics
Medalists at the 1998 Winter Paralympics
Medalists at the 2006 Winter Paralympics
Recipients of the Meritorious Service Decoration
Canadian Disability Hall of Fame
Sportspeople from Ottawa
Paralympic medalists in sledge hockey